American singer Demi Lovato has released eight studio albums, two video albums, two soundtrack albums, five extended plays (EPs), 44 singles (including 13 as a featured artist), 11 promotional singles. According to Recording Industry Association of America (RIAA), Lovato has achieved 31.5 million certified units. As of June 2021, she has sold 2.7 million albums and 23.8 million song downloads and her songs have registered 5.6 billion on-demand streams in the United States.

After signing with Hollywood Records, Lovato released her debut studio album Don't Forget, which debuted at number two on the Billboard 200.  Lovato's second studio album, Here We Go Again (2009), debuted at number one in the US, making Lovato one of the only singers to debut an album at number one on the Billboard 200 before turning 18 years old. Its eponymous lead single became her first top 15 entry on the Billboard Hot 100 as a solo artist. Lovato's third studio album, Unbroken (2011), debuted at number four on the Billboard 200, and spawned two singles: "Skyscraper" and "Give Your Heart a Break", the single "Skyscraper" reached the top ten in the US, New Zealand and the UK, the second single "Give Your Heart a Break" reached the top 20 in the US and also reached the top ten in New Zealand. In May 2013, Lovato released her fourth self-titled studio album Demi, which topped the chart in Canada and also reached number three in the US. The album's lead single "Heart Attack" reached the top ten in the US, Canada, New Zealand and reached number three in UK and Ireland.

Lovato's fifth studio album, Confident, was released in October 2015, her first release after signing with Island Records. It debuted at number two on the Billboard 200 and is certified Platinum by the RIAA. The lead single "Sorry Not Sorry" from Lovato's sixth studio album Tell Me You Love Me (2017), was a commercial and critical success, the song reached number six in the U.S. Billboard Hot 100, and also reached the top ten in Australia, New Zealand and the UK, becoming her most certified song having received a 5x platinum certificate in the RIAA. In November of that year, her collaboration with Luis Fonsi "Échame la Culpa" was released and went on to reach number one in seventeen countries. In 2018, Lovato topped the international charts with "Solo", which became her first number-one song in the UK, Germany and Ireland. In 2021, Lovato released her seventh studio album Dancing with the Devil... the Art of Starting Over, which reached number two on the Billboard 200 and UK chart. In August 2022, Lovato released her eighth studio album Holy Fvck.

Studio albums

Extended plays

Singles

As lead artist

As featured artist

Promotional singles

Other charted songs

See also
 Demi Lovato videography
 List of songs recorded by Demi Lovato

Footnotes

References

External links
 Official Website 
 Demi Lovato at All Music 
 
 

Discography
Discographies of American artists
Pop music discographies